Daniel McJunkin (November 30, 1756August 27, 1841) was an American Revolutionary War patriot serving in the battle of Kings Mountain, North Carolina.

Daniel McJunkin was the second son of Samuel Caldwell McJunkin and Mary Anne Bogan. He was brother of Major Joseph McJunkin. Daniel married Jane Chesney on February 28, 1782 in South Carolina.  She was born September 15, 1763 in County Antrim, Ulster Province, Ireland & died 27 Aug 1841 in Greenville County, South Carolina. Her family was Loyalist and her brother, Alexander, returned to Ireland after the American Revolution, and whose son was Francis Rawdon Chesney.

Daniel was a Revolutionary War Patriot, serving in the Battle of Kings Mountain, North Carolina.  Prior to this battle, he was captured by the British and escaped. He was later "run through" by a British Officer's sword.

References
 Memoirs of Major Joseph McJunkin - Revolutionary Patriot By Reverend James Hodge Saye
 McJunkin Family Genealogy Report
 Memoirs of Major Joseph McJunkin
 Sketch of Joseph Mcjunkin

1756 births
1841 deaths
Continental Army officers from South Carolina